Malabe West Grama Niladhari Division is a Grama Niladhari Division of the Kaduwela Divisional Secretariat  of Colombo District  of Western Province, Sri Lanka .  It has Grama Niladhari Division Code 476A.

Malabe Boys' School, Neville Fernando Teaching Hospital and Malabe  are located within, nearby or associated with Malabe West.

Malabe West is a surrounded by the Arangala, Hokandara North, Malabe East, Malabe North, Pothuarawa, Thalangama North B and Thalahena North  Grama Niladhari Divisions.

Demographics

Ethnicity 

The Malabe West Grama Niladhari Division has a Sinhalese majority (96.6%) . In comparison, the Kaduwela Divisional Secretariat (which contains the Malabe West Grama Niladhari Division) has a Sinhalese majority (95.6%)

Religion 

The Malabe West Grama Niladhari Division has a Buddhist majority (94.0%) . In comparison, the Kaduwela Divisional Secretariat (which contains the Malabe West Grama Niladhari Division) has a Buddhist majority (90.4%)

Gallery

References 

Grama Niladhari Divisions of Kaduwela Divisional Secretariat